The Second Awakening of Christa Klages is a 1978 West German drama film directed by Margarethe von Trotta, her debut solo film.

Plot
Worried about the prospects of her children's day care center and running out of money, Christa Klages, a young mother, robs a bank with the help of her lover Werner Wiedemann and another friend. When Werner is killed during the heist and when it becomes clear that the police are after her, Christa flees to Portugal to seek help from another friend, Ingrid Häkele, a situation that threatens both women's safety.

Cast
Tina Engel as Christa Klages
Silvia Reize as Ingrid Häkele
Katharina Thalbach as Lena Seidlhofer
Marius Müller-Westernhagen as Werner Wiedemann
Peter Schneider as Hans Grawe
Ulrich von Dobschütz as Heinz Häkele
Erika Wackernagel as Hans' Mother
Friedrich Kaiser as Wolfgang
Achim Krausz as Bank Director
Fritz Ley as Old Man
Gertrud Thomele as Christa's Mother
Rosa Sämmer as Janitress
Margit Czenki as Kindergarten Teacher Reingard
Peter Koj as Erich Grawe
Hildegard Linden as Woman
Ingrid Kraus as Lena's Colleague
Natascha Steuer as Mischa Klages
Josef Bierbichler as Homeowner
Luisa Francia as Christa's Friend
Felix Moeller	as Boy
Helga Kirchlechner
Bruno Thost
Karl Tischlinger

Release
The film was released on DVD by Water Bearer Films in 2005 as part of a box set together with Sisters, or the Balance of Happiness and Sheer Madness.

Reception
Critical reception has been overwhelmingly positive. The film was nominated for the best feature award (Gold Hugo) at the 1978 Chicago International Film Festival and has won the following awards, all in 1978: Otto-Dibelius-Preis, Deutscher Filmpreis (Filmband in Gold for acting as well as Filmband in Silber) and FBW (Deutsche Film- und Medienbewertung for high overall quality). It was called a "very earnest movie" by The New York Times critic Vincent Canby, an "acutely observed reflection" by Scott Tobias, and "compelling" by London's Time Out. A few reviews, however, were more negative. For example, Chicago Reader critic Dave Kehr wrote that "the film is very, very dull" and disliked what he saw as the overly serious demeanor of the characters.

References

External links

The Second Awakening of Christa Klages at the TCM Movie Database
Das zweite Erwachen der Christa Klages at Film Portal 

1978 drama films
1978 films
Films directed by Margarethe von Trotta
Films scored by Klaus Doldinger
Films set in West Germany
Films set in Portugal
German drama films
1970s German-language films
West German films
1970s German films